W. Gamini Epa was the 34th Auditor General of Sri Lanka. He was appointed on 2 May 1983, succeeding P. M. W. Wijayasuriya, and held the office until 26 January 1993. He was succeeded by S. M. Sabry.

References

Auditors General of Sri Lanka